Apenes lucidula is a species of ground beetle in the family Carabidae. It is found in the Caribbean Sea, Central America, and North America.

Subspecies
These three subspecies belong to the species Apenes lucidula:
 Apenes lucidula dulculia Ball & Shpeley, 1992
 Apenes lucidula lucidula (Dejean, 1831)
 Apenes lucidula michelii Ball & Shpeley, 1992

References

Further reading

 

Harpalinae
Articles created by Qbugbot
Beetles described in 1831